"This Suffering" is a song by Canadian alternative rock group Billy Talent. It was released in November 2007 as the fifth and final single from their second studio album, Billy Talent II.

Music video
The music video is a live performance video from clips of their DVD 666. It first appeared on the MuchMusic Countdown on November 29, 2007, at the number 30 spot, and peaked at the number 5 spot.

Chart performance

References

2007 singles
Billy Talent songs
Songs written by Ian D'Sa
Songs written by Benjamin Kowalewicz
Songs written by Jonathan Gallant
Songs written by Aaron Solowoniuk
Song recordings produced by Gavin Brown (musician)
2006 songs
Atlantic Records singles